"Diamante lei e luce lui" is the debut song by Italian singer Annalisa. It was written by Roberto Casalino and produced by Dado Parisini.

It was released by Warner Music Italy on 7 March 2011 and included in Annalisa's first studio album Nali. The song premiered during the tenth edition of talent show Amici di Maria De Filippi. "Diamante lei e luce lui" peaked at number 9 on the FIMI Singles Chart and was certified gold in Italy.

Music video
A music video to accompany the release of "Diamante lei e luce lui" premiered on 30 March 2011 on the website of newspaper Corriere della Sera and was then released onto YouTube on 5 April. The video was directed by Serena Corvaglia and Marco Salom.

Track listing

Charts

Certifications

References

2011 debut singles
2011 singles
2011 songs
Annalisa songs
Songs written by Roberto Casalino